Alonso del Arco (1635–1704) was a Spanish painter.

Life
Born at Madrid in 1635, he was a disciple of Antonio de Pereda. He was deaf from birth and was called "El Sordillo de Pereda". He was an eminent painter, both of history and portraits. Several of his pictures are mentioned by Palomino, particularly the Miraculous Conception, and the Assumption of the Virgin, in the cloister of the Trinitarios Descalzos at Madrid, and in the church of San Salvador is a fine picture of Santa Teresa. Cean Bermudez enumerates a great number of his works in the churches at Madrid, and in other public buildings throughout Spain. He died at Madrid in 1704.

Notes

References
 Palomino, Antonio (1988). The pictorial museum optical scale III. The picturesque Spanish Parnassus laureate. Madrid: Aguilar SA Editions. .
 Pérez Sánchez, Alfonso E. (1992). Baroque painting in Spain. From 1600 to 1750. Madrid: Ediciones Chair. .

Attribution:
 

1635 births
1704 deaths
17th-century Spanish painters
Spanish male painters
Deaf artists
Artists from Madrid
Spanish deaf people